Dark Horse is a 1992 American drama film directed by David Hemmings. The screenplay by Janet Maclean was adapted from an original story by Tab Hunter, who also co-produced and played a supporting role.

Plot
The plot focuses on new-girl-in-town Allison Mills, a teenager whose mother recently died. When she hangs out with the wrong crowd, she gets into trouble and is sentenced to community service at a local stable. There she comes to love spending time with the animals until an automobile accident disables her and her favorite horse Jet. The wheelchair-using girl learns to overcome her handicap through the indomitable spirit of the horse, who overcomes the odds and runs again.

Principal cast
Ed Begley Jr. as Jack Mills
Mimi Rogers as Dr. Susan Hadley
Ari Meyers as Allison Mills
Donovan Leitch as J.B. Hadley
Samantha Eggar as Mrs. Curtis
Natasha Gregson Wagner as Martha
Tab Hunter as Perkins
Tisha Sterling as Officer Ross

Production notes
This film was the second project brought to the screen (the first being Lust in the Dust) by Glaser/Hunter Productions, owned by Tab Hunter and his life partner Allan Glaser.
  
Hunter, an avid horse rider and owner, was inspired for his story by an Arabian horse that was used as a double in the 1979 film The Black Stallion. After breaking his leg, the animal spent a full year recuperating in a sling. Although he never walked properly again, when set loose he could run with no problem.

Director Hemmings insisted on shooting in his home base of Sun Valley, Idaho, where he was surrounded by an entourage offering strong support. He drank heavily during filming, and often was barely functional at the end of the day. Producer Allan Glaser tolerated his erratic and boorish behavior only because the dailies were so good.

The film was shown at the 1992 Cannes Film Festival and received positive reviews. It was released theatrically on July 17, 1992.

References

External links
 

1992 films
Films about horses
1992 drama films
American drama films
1990s English-language films
Films directed by David Hemmings
1990s American films
Films about disability